Bedford Township is one of the twenty-two townships of Coshocton County, Ohio, United States. As of the 2010 census the population was 564.

Geography
Located in the southwestern part of the county, it borders the following townships:
Jefferson Township - north
Bethlehem Township - northeast corner
Jackson Township - east
Washington Township - south
Pike Township - southwest
Perry Township - west
Newcastle Township - northwest corner

No municipalities are located in Bedford Township, although the unincorporated communities of Tunnel Hill and West Bedford lie in the township's central and western sections, respectively.

Name and history
Bedford Township was organized in 1825. Many of its first settlers were natives of Bedford County, Pennsylvania, hence the name.

Statewide, the only other Bedford Township is located in Meigs County.

Government
The township is governed by a three-member board of trustees, who are elected in November of odd-numbered years to a four-year term beginning on the following January 1. Two are elected in the year after the presidential election and one is elected in the year before it. There is also an elected township fiscal officer, who serves a four-year term beginning on April 1 of the year after the election, which is held in November of the year before the presidential election. Vacancies in the fiscal officership or on the board of trustees are filled by the remaining trustees.

References

External links
County website

Townships in Coshocton County, Ohio
Townships in Ohio